Baiso is a comune (municipality) in the Province of Reggio Emilia in the Italian region Emilia-Romagna, located about  west of Bologna and about  south of Reggio Emilia.

Baiso borders the following municipalities: Carpineti, Castellarano, Prignano sulla Secchia, Toano, Viano.

References

Cities and towns in Emilia-Romagna